Sir Derek Peter Hornby (10 January 1930 – 16 December 2013) was a British business executive who was chairman of London and Continental Railways.

Hornby was born in Bournemouth and attended Canford School in Dorset. He was twice married, firstly to Margaret (nee Withers) then to Sonia (nee Beesley). 

His four children include the novelist Nick Hornby and Gill, who married the author Robert Harris. Hornby was knighted in 1990.

References 

1930 births
2013 deaths
British business executives
20th-century British businesspeople
Railway executives
Place of birth missing
Place of death missing